Live Twenty-Five is a 2006 live album by 10,000 Maniacs, recorded to commemorate the band's 25th anniversary, and was only sold on tour. It is their first release with Oskar Saville as lead singer.

Track listing
"What's the Matter Here?" (Rob Buck, Natalie Merchant) – 4:52
"Candy Everybody Wants" (Dennis Drew, Natalie Merchant) – 3:17
"Trouble Me" (Dennis Drew, Natalie Merchant) – 3:16
"Eden" (Jerome Augustyniak, Rob Buck, Dennis Drew, Steve Gustafson, Natalie Merchant) – 4:06
"Don't Talk" (Dennis Drew, Natalie Merchant) – 5:26
"Send Me off with a Kiss" (Oskar Saville) – 5:04
"City of Angels" (Rob Buck, Natalie Merchant) – 4:34
"Stockton Gala Days" (Jerome Augustyniak, Rob Buck, Dennis Drew, Steve Gustafson, Natalie Merchant) – 8:12
"Because the Night" (Patti Smith, Bruce Springsteen) – 4:31
"These Are Days" (Rob Buck, Natalie Merchant) – 6:34
"My Sister Rose" (Jerome Augustyniak, Natalie Merchant) – 3:43
"Hey Jack Kerouac" (Rob Buck, Natalie Merchant) – 3:38
"Few and Far Between" (Natalie Merchant) – 4:31
"Angel of Harlem" (Adam Clayton, Dave Evans, Paul Hewson, Larry Mullen Jr.) – 6:02

Personnel
Jerome Augustyniak:  drums, percussion
Dennis Drew: organ, piano
Jeff Erickson: guitar
Steven Gustafson:  bass guitar
Mary Ramsey: electric violin
Oskar Saville:  vocals

10,000 Maniacs live albums
2006 live albums